Jaap van der Leck (10 September 1911, Oudshoorn – 18 November 2000 in Tilburg) was a Dutch football manager.

He worked for DSO, RFC Rotterdam, UVV Utrecht, De Volewijckers, the Netherlands national football team, SC Enschede, Feyenoord, DOS Utrecht, Heracles Almelo, Willem II, DWS.

References

External links
 Profile 

1911 births
2000 deaths
Dutch footballers
Dutch football managers
Netherlands national football team managers
Feyenoord managers
Heracles Almelo managers
Willem II (football club) managers
AFC DWS managers
Footballers from Alphen aan den Rijn
VV DOS managers
AVV De Volewijckers managers

Association footballers not categorized by position